Big Ideas is a 1993 TV movie, touted as "From the Producers of Blue Heelers".

Plot
Jimmy Kovak attends a Sydney public (State) school, and is falling behind in his studies, partly because of his love of soccer, and his part-time work producing compost from garbage he collects, and which he sells at a local hardware store.

His next door neighbor has an antipathy to the Kovaks, at least partly because of their nationality, and runs a spiteful campaign against the boy, resulting in confiscation of his compost bins, and other harassment.

His widowed mother is handicapped by her inability to recognize the Latin alphabet (presumably she can read Cyrillic perfectly), and is too embarrassed to seek help, so is forced to accept piece-work, sewing at slave wages. Financial relief comes in the form of Sam Stevens, who recognizes the boy's ingenuity and offers him a contract to invent a chicken feeder. Sam gives Jimmy some valuable lessons in planning and time management.

Jimmy is made aware of oil pollution from a nearby outfall, and with a team of fellow students investigates its source and photographs the culprit in the act. His teacher, Mr. Searle, accepts the report as their Social Studies homework.

His mother grows closer to Sam Stevens, and enrolls in an English reading course.

Cast
Peter Kowitz as Mr Searle
Justin Rosniak as Jimmy Kovak
Troy O'Hearn as Ronnie Dixon
Salvatore Coco as Ernesto
Adam Lloyd as Harry
Mario Gamma as Ben
Peter Lu as Van
Paul Chubb as Noel Draper
Gosia Dobrowolska as Anna Kovak
Genevieve Lemon as Beth Draper
Silvio Ofria as Mr. Galea
Glenda Linscott as Liz Dixon
Demetra Polycarpou as Maria
Nicola Lester as Susie Peters
Bruce Venables as Mr. Hartley
Harold Hopkins as Sam Stevens
Xuan Mai as Mr. Tranh
Anna Hruby as FACS Woman
William Usic as FACS Man

DVD
Flashback Entertainment has had copies for sale, rated PG (Adult Themes), but it is hard to see why. There is no Sex, Nudity, Violence, Gore, Profanity, Alcohol, Drugs, Smoking, Frightening or Intense Scenes. The "Adult Themes" are loyalty, the futility of retribution,  cooperation, politeness, planning ...

References

External links

Australian drama television films
Films set in Sydney
1993 television films
1993 films
British drama television films
1990s English-language films
1990s British films